Dendrocacalia is a genus of flowering plants in the daisy family.

There is only one known species,  Dendrocacalia crepidifolia, endemic to Haha-jima (Haha Island, one of Ogasawara Islands (Bonin Islands) in the North Pacific, part of Japan).

References

Senecioneae
Flora of the Bonin Islands
Endemic flora of Japan
Monotypic Asteraceae genera